Anthimus III (1762–1842) was Ecumenical Patriarch of Constantinople during the period 1822-1824.

Biography
He was born in Koronis (Komiaki) of Naxos in 1762. His father was a priest in the village, with descent from the Laconia. His last name was Chorianopoulos. He served as deacon of the Patriarchate during the Patriarchy of Neophytus VII and was Great Archdeacon from 1791. In April 1797 he became Protosyncellus of the Ecumenical Patriarchate.

He was elected Metropolitan of Smyrna in 1797 as successor of the Metropolitan Gregory, who was elected Patriarch, as Gregory V. In 1821 he was elected Metropolitan of Chalcedon (1821-1822). The Turks, in retaliation for the spread the Greek Revolution, arrested him together with other hierarchs and imprisoned him for 7 months in the dungeons of a prison of Istanbul. In 1822, after the hanging of Gregory V and the death of his successor Eugenius II from torture suffered at the hands of the Ottomans, Anthimus, who was still imprisoned, was elected Patriarch.

As Patriarch he succeeded in maintaining the independence of the Church of Cyprus and its prerogatives, during a period when the Ottomans proceeded with executions of clerics and kodjabashis on the island, while even member of the Holy Synod advocated the abolition of the Church. Anthimus also refused to allow a British Protestant to publish a translation of the Bible to Demotic Greek by the Partiarchal Typography.

In 1824, Anthimus III was deposed by Sultan Mahmud II because he refused to cooperate with him against the Greek Revolution, and with the accusation that he favoured the independence of the Serbs from the Ottoman Empire. He took refuge in Üsküdar and was later exiled to the Timiou Prodromou Monastery in Kayseri of Cappadocia. After many months of exile and many hardships that affected his health, in December 1825 the Sultan allowed him to return to Smyrna.

There he stayed in a small apartment in the Upper Mahalla and often participated in the local ecclesiastic life. He also served as deputy of the Metropolis of Smyrna in 1831 and in 1833. He died in 1842 in the Greek Hospital of Smyrna and bequeathed his entire fortune to churches and charitable institutions of the city. His magnificent funeral was held by the Metropolitan of Ephesus, Anthimus and was buried in the church of John the Theologian, where until the Asia Minor Catastrophe there was also a big icon of him.

Sources 
 Οικουμενικό Πατριαρχείο
 Encyclopaedia of the Hellenic World, Asia Minor

1762 births
1842 deaths
Bishops of Chalcedon
Eastern Orthodox bishops of Smyrna
19th-century Ecumenical Patriarchs of Constantinople
People from Naxos